Sarah Geronimo is a Filipina singer, dancer, actress and record producer. She has received several awards and nominations for her work in music, film, and television. She has also won the Best Asian Artist at the Mnet Asian Music Awardsin 2012, Best Southeast Asian Act at the MTV Europe Music Awards in 2014, Best Selling Filipino Artist at the 22nd World Music Awards and Best Asian Performer at Classic Rock Roll of Honour Awards in 2016. She was inducted into the Anak TV Hall of Fame in 2013. Geronimo is a Goodwill Ambassador for Music of the National Commission for Culture and the Arts and a recipient of their Ani ng Dangal or "Harvest of Honors" state recognition for multi-disciplinary arts.

Aliw Awards

|-
| 2003 || Herself || Most Promising Female Entertainer   || 
|-
|2004 || Forever's Not Enough || Best Performance By Female Recording Artist || 
|-
|2004 || Sa Iyo || Best Dance Song|| 
|-
|rowspan="2"| 2010 || Record Breaker || Best Female Major Concert Act || 
|-
|| Herself  || Entertainer of the Year || 
|-
| 2011 || What Love Is || Best Collaboration For A Concert  || 
|-
| 2012 || 24/SG || Best Female Major Concert of the Year || 
|-
| 2015 || Herself || Best Female Performer in Mall Shows || 
|-

Awit Awards

|-
|| 2003 || Herself || Best New Female Recording Artist   || 
|-
|rowspan="2"| 2004 || Forever's Not Enough || Best Performance by a New Female Recording Artist   || 
|-
| Sa Iyo || Best Dance Recording  || 
|-
| 2008 || Ikaw || Song of the Year   || 
|-
| 2009 || Ngayon, Bukas at Kailanman || Best Song Written for Movie/TV/Stage Play || 
|-
| rowspan="2"|2010 || Right Here Waiting || Music Uplate Live Texter's Choice Best Performance by a Female Recording Artist || 
|-
|| Herself || EGG's AllHits.ph Most Downloaded Artist  || 
|-
|rowspan="6"| 2012 || One Heart || Best Selling Album of the Year  || 
|-
|| Wish with Anton Alvarez || Best Collaboration  || 
|-
|| One Heart || Album of the Year  || 
|-
|| Sino Nga Ba Sya || Best Ballad Recording  || 
|-
|| Sino Nga Ba Sya || EGG's AllHits.ph Most Downloaded Song  || 
|-
|| Herself || EGG's AllHits.ph Most Downloaded Artist  || 
|-
|rowspan="3"| 2013 || Tao || Best Performance by a Female Recording Artist || 
|-
|| Tao || Best Ballad Recording || 
|-
|| Pure OPM Classics || Album of the Year || 
|-
|rowspan="7"| 2014 || Ikot-Ikot || Best Performance by a Female Recording Artist || 
|-
|| Ikot-Ikot || Song of the Year || 
|-
|| Ikot-Ikot || Best R&B Recording || 
|-
|| Expressions || Album of the Year || 
|-
|| Expressions || Best Selling Album of The Year || 
|-
|| Sweetest Mistake || Best Ballad Recording || 
|-
|| Make Me Yours || Best Inspirational/Religious Recording || 
|-
|rowspan="6"| 2015 || Kilometro || Best Performance by a Female Recording Artist || 
|-
|| Kilometro || Song of the Year || 
|-
|| Kilometro || Best R&B Recording || 
|-
|| Perfectly Imperfect || Album of the Year || 
|-
|| Perfectly Imperfect || Best Album Package || 
|-
|| Kilometro || Music Video of the Year || 
|-
|rowspan="5"| 2016 || The Great Unknown || Album of the Year || 
|-
|| Tala || Song of the Year || 
|-
|| Unbroken || Best Ballad Recording || 
|-
|| Sariling Awit Natin || Best Song Written for Movie/TV/Stage Play || 
|-
|| Paano Ba Ang Magmahal? || Best Song Written for Movie/TV/Stage Play || 
|-
|rowspan="3"| 2019 || Isa Pang Araw || Best Performance by a Female Recording Artist || 
|-
|| Isa Pang Araw ||  Best Song Written for Movie/TV/Stage Play || 
|-
|| Herself || Favorite Female Artist || 
|-

Box Office Entertainment Awards

|-
| 2003 || Herself || Most Promising Singer || 
|-
| 2005 || Sweet Sixteen || Female Recording Artist of the Year || 
|-
| 2006 || Becoming || Female Recording Artist of the Year || 
|-
| 2008
 || In Motion || Female Concert Performer of the Year || 
|-
|rowspan="3"| 2009 || Just Me || Female Recording Artist of the Year || 
|-
|| The Next One || Female Concert Performer of the Year || 
|-
|| A Very Special Love || Box Office Queen || 
|-
| 2010 || You Changed My Life || Box Office Queen || 
|-
| 2011 || Record Breaker || Female Recording Artist of the Year || 
|-
| 2012 || Catch Me ... I'm In Love || Princess Of Philippine Movies || 
|-
| rowspan=4|2014 || Expressions || Female Recording Artist of the Year || 
|-
| Perfect 10 || Female Concert Performer of the Year || 
|-
| It Takes A Man And A Woman || Box Office Queen || 
|-
| Herself || Female Star of the Night || 
|-
| 2015  || Perfectly Imperfect || Female Recording Artist of the Year || 
|-
| 2016 || Perfectly Imperfect || Female Recording Artist of the Year || 
|-
| 2017 || The Great Unknown || Female Recording Artist of the Year ||

Classic Rock Awards

FAMAS Awards

|-
|rowspan="2"| 2009 || Ngayon, Bukas at Kailanman ||  Best Theme Song  || 
|-
|| Herself ||  Golden Artist Award  || style="background: orange" |Recipient 
|-
|rowspan="2"| 2010 || You Changed My Life||  Best Actress  || 
|-
|| You Changed My Life in a Moment || Best Theme Song ||  
|-
| 2014 || It Takes A Man And A Woman ||  Best Actress  || 
|-
| 2015 || Herself || Iconic Movie Queen of Philippine Cinema ||  style="background: orange" |Recipient 
|-
| 2016 || Ang Sugo ng Diyos sa mga Huling Araw ||Best Theme Song  ||
|-
|rowspan="2"| 2019 || Isa Pang Araw ||  Best Theme Song  || 
|-
|| Miss Granny ||  Best Actress  ||

Golden Screen TV Awards

|-
|2009 || A Very Special Love ||  Best Performance by an Actress in a Lead Role (Musical or Comedy)  || 
|-
|2010 || You Changed My Life ||  Best Performance by an Actress in a Lead Role (Musical or Comedy)  || 
|-
|2014 || It Takes A Man And A Woman ||  Best Performance by an Actress in a Lead Role (Musical or Comedy)  || 
|-

KBP Golden Dove Awards

|-
| 2006 || Little Big Star || Best Variety Program || 
|-
| 2013 || Sarah G. Live || Best Variety Program ||

Mnet Asian Music Awards

MTV Awards

MTV Europe Music Awards

Myx Music Awards

|-
|rowspan="3"| 2006 || Herself || Favorite Female Artist || 
|-
|| I Wanna Know What Love Is  || Favorite Remake || 
|-
|| Love Can't Lie  || Favorite Mellow Video || 
|-
|rowspan="2"| 2007 || Herself || Favorite Female Artist || 
|-
|| I Still Believe In Loving You  || Favorite Mellow Video || 
|-
|rowspan="4"| 2008 || Herself || Favorite Artist || 
|-
|| Herself  || Favorite Female Artist || 
|-
|| Ikaw  || Favorite Song || 
|-
|| Herself  || Favorite Celebrity VJ || 
|-
|rowspan="6"| 2009 || Herself || Favorite Artist || 
|-
|| Herself  || Favorite Female Artist || 
|-
|| Herself  || Favorite Celebrity VJ || 
|-
|| A Very Special Love  || Favorite Media Soundtrack || 
|-
|| A Very Special Love  || Favorite Mellow Video || 
|-
|| A Very Special Love  || Favorite Remake || 
|-
|rowspan="4"| 2010 || Herself || Favorite Artist || 
|-
|| Herself  || Favorite Female Artist || 
|-
|| Record Breaker  || Favorite Media Soundtrack || 
|-
|| You Changed My Life In A Moment  || Favorite Remake || 
|-
|rowspan="4"| 2011 || Herself || Favorite Female Artist   || 
|-
|| Sino Nga Ba S'ya  || Favorite Mellow Video || 
|-
|| Please Be Careful With My Heart  || Favorite Collaboration || 
|-
|| Love Will Keep Us Together  || Favorite Media Soundtrack || 
|-
|rowspan="2"| 2012 || Fallin || Favorite Media Soundtrack   || 
|-
|| Herself  || Favorite Female Artist || 
|-
|rowspan="4"| 2013 || Herself || Favorite Artist   || 
|-
|| Herself  || Favorite Female Artist || 
|-
|| Bakit Pa Ba  || Favorite Remake || 
|-
|| Tuloy  || Favorite Media Soundtrack || 
|-
|rowspan="6"| 2014 || Ikot-ikot || Favorite Music Video || 
|-
|| Ikot-ikot || Favorite Song || 
|-
|| Herself  || Favorite Artist || 
|-
|| Herself || Favorite Female Artist || 
|-
|| It Takes a Man and a Woman || Favorite Media Soundtrack || 
|-
|| It Takes a Man and a Woman || Favorite Remake || 
|-
|rowspan="5"| 2015 || Tayo || Favorite Music Video || 
|-
|| Herself || Favorite Artist || 
|-
|| Herself || Favorite Female Artist || 
|-
|| Maybe this Time || Favorite Remake || 
|-
|| Do the Moves || Favorite Media Soundtrack || 
|-
|rowspan="5"| 2016 || Minamahal || Favorite Music Video || 
|-
|| Herself || Favorite Artist || 
|-
|| Herself || Favorite Female Artist || 
|-
|| Paano Ba Ang Magmahal || Favorite Media Soundtrack || 
|-
|| Minamahal || Best Music Video || 
|-
|rowspan=6| 2017 || Tala || Favorite Music Video || 
|-
|| Tala || Favorite Song || 
|-
|| Herself || Favorite Female Artist || 
|-
|| Herself || Favorite Artist || 
|-
|| The Great Unknown || Favorite Collaboration || 
|-
|| The Great Unknown || Best Music Video || 
|-
|rowspan=5| 2018 || Misteryo || Favorite Music Video || 
|-
|| Kaibigan Mo || Favorite Song || 
|-
|| Kaibigan Mo (shared with Yeng Constantino) || Favorite Collaboration || 
|-
|| Herself || Favorite Female Artist || 
|-
|| Herself || Favorite Artist ||

Nickelodeon Kid's Choice

Nickelodeon Kids' Choice Awards

Nickelodeon Philippines Kids' Choice Awards

|-
| 2004 || Herself || Kids' Choice Award || 
|-
| 2008 || Herself || Favorite Actress || 
|-

PMPC Star Awards

PMPC Star Awards for Music

|-
| rowspan="5"| 2009 || Herself || Female Pop Artist of the Year || 
|-
| OPM || Album of the Year || 
|-
| Ikaw || Song of the Year || 
|-
| Herself || Female Recording Artist of the Year || 
|-
| Ikaw || Music Video of the Year || 
|-
| rowspan="2"|2010 || Music and Me || Female Recording Artist of the Year || 
|-
| Herself || Female Pop Artist of the Year || 
|-
| rowspan="5"|2011 || One Heart || Female Recording Artist of the Year || 
|-
| One Heart || Album of the Year || 
|-
| One Heart || Pop Album of the Year || 
|-
| Sino Nga Ba Siya? || Song of the Year || 
|-
| Herself || Female Pop Artist of the Year || 
|-
| rowspan="2"| 2012 || What Love Is || Female Concert Performer of the Year || 
|-
| What Love Is || Concert of the Year || 
|-
| rowspan="3"|2013 || Herself || Female Recording Artist of the Year || 
|-
| 24/SG || Concert of the Year || 
|-
| 24/SG || Female Concert Performer of the Year || 
|-
| rowspan="8"|2014 || Expressions || Pop Album of the Year || 
|-
| Expressions || Album of the Year || 
|-
| Herself || Female Recording Artist of the Year || 
|-
| Herself || Female Pop Artist of the Year || 
|-
| Perfect 10 || Female Concert Performer of the Year || 
|-
| Ikot-Ikot || Song of the Year || 
|-
| Expressions ||  Album Cover Concept and Design of the Year || 
|-
| Ikot-Ikot || Music Video of the Year || 
|-
| rowspan="6"|2015 || Herself || Female Recording Artist of the Year || 
|-
| Perfectly Imperfect || Album of the Year || 
|-
| Herself || Female Pop Artist of the Year || 
|-
| Perfectly Imperfect ||  Album Cover Concept and Design of the Year || 
|-
| Perfectly Imperfect || Pop Album of the Year || 
|-
| Kilometro || Music Video of the Year || 
|-
| rowspan="8"|2016 || The Great Unknown || Album Of The Year || 
|-
| Tala || Song of The Year || 
|-
| Herself || Female Recording Artist of The Year || 
|-
| Herself || Female Pop Artist of The Year || 
|-
| From The Top || Female Concert Performer of The Year || 
|-
| From The Top || Concert of The Year || 
|-
| The Great Unknown || Pop Album of The Year || 
|-
| The Great Unknown || Cover Design of The Year || 
|-
| rowspan="4"|2018 ||  
|-
| The Great Unknown: Unplugged || Concert of the Year || 
|-
| Herself || Female Concert Performer of The Year ||

PMPC Star Awards for Movies 

|-
|rowspan="2"| 2009 || Ngayon, Bukas at Kailanman ||  Best Movie Theme Song  || 
|-
|| Herself ||  Female Star of the Night  || 
|-
|rowspan="2"| 2016 || The Breakup Playlist||  Movie Actress of the Year  || 
|-
|| Ang Sugo Ng Diyos Sa Mga Huling Araw || Movie Original Theme Song of the Year    || 
|-
|| 2019 || Miss Granny||  Movie Actress of the Year  || 
|-

World Music Awards

References

Geronimo, Sarah
Lists of awards received by Filipino actor